Justin Maxwell Sedgmen (born 17 February 1992) is an Australian motorcycle speedway rider.

Career

Junior career
Born in Mildura, Victoria, Justin Sedgmen and his older brother Ryan (born December 1990) began their speedway careers at Mildura's Olympic Park Speedway on the  infield junior track.

Justin and Ryan teamed to win the 2005 and 2006 Australian Under-16 Pairs Championships, and Justin followed that up by winning again in 2007 with Dakota North (after his brother had turned 16 and was riding in the senior ranks).

Justin Sedgmen finished the 2007 Australian Under-16 Championship at the Gold Coast Speedway in Queensland in equal first place with 13 points with Dakota North, but ultimately finished 3rd in the Final behind North and future Under-21 World Champion Darcy Ward.

Senior career
In 2009 both Justin and Ryan signed a contract with Speedway Ekstraliga team Unia Leszno, but they did not start in the league. Before a 2010 season, Sedgmen signed to Hungarian Speedway Miskolc. He also rode for Swindon Robins in 2010 and 2011.

In 2011, Justin Sedgmen won the Jack Young Solo Cup at the Gillman Speedway in Adelaide. Also in 2011, Sedgmen was part of the Australian Under-21 Team that won the second semi-final of the Under-21 World Cup. Australia withdrew from the Final in Balakovo, Russia due to travel cost and visa problems, along with Sweden and Great Britain.

In 2012, Sedgmen rode for Redcar Bears in the Premier League, doubling up with Lakeside Hammers in the Elite League, but was dropped by the Bears in July after inconsistent performances.

In 2012, Sedgeman won his first senior title, winning the Victorian State Championship at Undera Park.

After sitting out the 2013 UK season, Sedgmen joined Edinburgh Monarchs in the Premier League in 2014, winning the league title with the team, and going on to ride for them for two seasons.

Sedgmen won the 2014–15 Gillman Speedway Division 1 Solo Championship on 6 December 2014. He set the tone for the meeting in the first heat of the night with a time of 55.0 seconds, easily the fastest time of the night and only one-tenth outside Leigh Adams' almost 6-year-old track record.

Sedgmen finished a to date career best third place in the four round 2015 Australian Championship behind runaway winner Jason Doyle and runner-up Sam Masters. Sedgemen and reigning Australian U/21 Champion Max Fricke both finished the series on 48 points, but was awarded third place after having finished in front of Fricke in each of the B or A Finals they contested against each other over the series. Also, Sedgmen qualified for the A final in both Round 1 at Gillman and again in Round 2 at Mildura while Fricke only qualified for the A final in Round 3 at Undera Park. Sedgmen's best A final result was second at Gillman behind Doyle while he finished third behind Doyle and 2012 World Champion Chris Holder at Olympic Park.

Later in 2015, Sedgmen and Max Fricke were named as the two reserve riders for the 2015 Speedway Grand Prix of Australia which was held at the Etihad Stadium in Melbourne, although neither got to race on the night. A fortnight later Sedgmen raced in the Darcy Ward Tribute Meeting at Gillman in Adelaide to raise money for the injured Australian rider. Sedgmen won his semi-final to make the A final, but was excluded for breaking the tapes at the start of the final.

In November 2015, Sedgmen rejoined Swindon Robins for the 2016 Elite League season, and signed to ride for Grindsted in Denmark.

In 2015 he finished third in the Australian Solo Championship. In 2016 he signed to ride for Lokomotiv Daugavpils in the Polish first division, but didn't ride for them, and in June was loaned to Ekstraliga team Falubaz Zielona Góra. Also in 2016, he won the Jason Crump Invitational at Kurri Kurri.

For the 2017 season he rode for Belle Vue and Ipswich and after missing the 2018 British season returned to ride for Sheffield Tigers and Glasgow during 2021.

In 2022, he rode for the Sheffield in the SGB Premiership 2022 and for the Birmingham Brummies in the SGB Championship 2022. He helped Sheffield win the 2022 League cup and reach the Play off final. In 2023, he signed for Leicester Lions for the SGB Premiership 2023 and re-signed for Birmingham for the SGB Championship 2023.

Family
He is the son of former Australian rider Gavin Sedgmen and the grandson of Phil Sedgmen.

Major results

World Championships
Under-21 Individual World Championship
 2009 – 10th placed in the Semi-Final Two
 2010 – qualify to the Semi-Final

Under-21 World Cup (Australian Team)
 2009 – 3rd placed in the Qualifying Round One
 2010 – 2nd placed in the Qualifying Round One
 2011* – Won Semi-final Two
* Australia withdrew from the 2011 U/21 WC Final due to the cost of travel and visa problems

Australian Domestic Championships
Australian Under-16 Championship
 2004 – Mildura, Victoria, Olympic Park Speedway – 11th – 6pts
 2005 – Somersby, New South Wales, Allen Park Speedway – 5th – 10pts
 2006 – Adelaide, South Australia, Sidewinders Speedway – NC – 7pts (excluded from meeting)
 2007 – Gold Coast, Queensland, Gold Coast Speedway – 3rd – 13pts (=1st) – 3rd in Final
 2008 – Perth, Western Australia, Pinjar Park Speedway – 4th – 14pts (2nd) – Dnf in Final (fell)

Australian Under-16 Pairs Championship
 2004 – 2nd – 23pts (7) (with Ryan Sedgmen)
 2005 – Winner – 25pts (with Ryan Sedgmen)
 2006 – Winner – 25pts (7) (with Ryan Sedgmen)
 2007 – Winner – 25pts (17) (with Dakota North)
 2008 – 2nd – 22pts (16) (with Josh Munro)

Australian Under-21 Championship
 2009 – Gosford, NSW, Gosford Speedway – 4th – 7pts (6th) – 4th in Final
 2010 – Mildura, Vic, Olympic Park Speedway – 2nd – 12pts (2nd) – 2nd in Final
 2011 – Brisbane, Qld, North Brisbane Speedway – N/A
 2012 – Kurri Kurri, NSW, Loxford Park Speedway – 2nd – 9pts (6th) – 2nd in Final
 2013 – Kurri Kurri, NSW, Loxford Park Speedway –  3rd – 12pts (2nd) – 3rd in Final

Australian Championship
 2009 – 15th – 16pts (3 rounds)
 2010 – 7th – 36pts (3 rounds)
 2011 – 5th – 51pts (4 rounds)
 2012 – 8th – 38pts (3 rounds)
 2013 – N/A (3 rounds)
 2014 – 6th – 53pts (3 rounds)
 2015 – 3rd – 48pts (4 rounds)
 2016 – 6th – 46pts (4 rounds)
 2017 – 2nd – 55pts (4 rounds)

Victorian Championship
2012 – Undera, Vic, Undera Park Speedway – Winner

Polish Domestic competitions
 Team Polish Championship (Polish league)
 2010 – for Unia Leszno

Speedway Grand Prix results

See also
 Australia national under-21 speedway team

References

1992 births
Living people
Australian speedway riders
Belle Vue Aces riders
Birmingham Brummies riders
Edinburgh Monarchs riders
Glasgow Tigers riders
Ipswich Witches riders
Lakeside Hammers riders
Leicester Lions riders
Newport Wasps riders
Redcar Bears riders
Sheffield Tigers riders
Somerset Rebels riders
Swindon Robins riders
People from Mildura